Pond Creek is a stream in Greene County in the U.S. state of Missouri. It is a tributary of the Sac River.

Pond Creek flows near ponds, hence the name.

See also
List of rivers of Missouri

References

Rivers of Greene County, Missouri
Rivers of Missouri